Nikoletta Nagy (born 26 October 1994) is a Hungarian model and beauty pageant titleholder who was crowned Miss Universe Hungary 2015 and represented Hungary in the Miss Universe 2015 and pageant.

Personal life
Nagy is a student of Biological Engineering at Corvinus University of Budapest.

Miss Universe Hungary 2015
On 6 June 2015 Nagy was crowned Miss Universe Hungary 2015. The pageant was broadcast by TV2 Hungary. A total of sixteen contestants competed for the crown.

Miss Universe 2015
As Miss Hungary 2015, Nagy competed at the Miss Universe 2015 pageant in Las Vegas.

References 

Living people
Hungarian beauty pageant winners
1995 births
Miss Universe 2015 contestants
People from Miskolc